Their Last Love Affair (German: Ihr letztes Liebesabenteuer) is a 1927 German silent film directed by Max Reichmann and starring Gustav Fröhlich, Vera Schmiterlöw and Carmen Boni. In the United Kingdom it was released under the alternative title of Always Tell Auntie.

Cast
 Gustav Fröhlich as Marys Mann  
 Vera Schmiterlöw as Mary  
 Carmen Boni as Marys Tante  
 Hugo Döblin 
 Robert Leffler 
 Henri De Vries
 Ellen Douglas 
 Max Nosseck 
 Paul Seelig
 Ernst Dernburg

References

Bibliography
 Bock, Hans-Michael & Bergfelder, Tim. The Concise CineGraph. Encyclopedia of German Cinema. Berghahn Books, 2009.

External links

1927 films
Films of the Weimar Republic
Films directed by Max Reichmann
German silent feature films
German black-and-white films